In mathematics, an affine bundle is a fiber bundle whose typical fiber, fibers, trivialization morphisms and transition functions are affine.

Formal definition
Let  be a vector bundle with a typical fiber a vector space . An affine bundle modelled on a vector bundle  is a fiber bundle  whose typical fiber  is an affine space modelled on  so that the following conditions hold:

(ii) There is an affine bundle atlas of  whose local trivializations morphisms and transition functions are affine isomorphisms.

Dealing with affine bundles, one uses only affine bundle coordinates  possessing affine transition functions

 

There are the bundle morphisms

 

where  are linear bundle coordinates on a vector bundle ,  possessing linear transition functions .

Properties
An affine bundle  has a global section, but in contrast with vector bundles, there is no canonical global section of an affine bundle. Let  be an affine bundle modelled on a vector bundle . Every global section  of an affine bundle  yields the bundle morphisms

 

For instance, the tangent bundle  of a manifold  naturally is an affine bundle. 

An affine bundle  is a fiber bundle with a general affine structure group  of affine transformations of its typical fiber  of dimension . This structure group always is reducible to a general linear group , i.e., an affine bundle admits an atlas with linear transition functions.

Every affine bundle morphism  of an affine bundle  modelled on a vector bundle  to an affine bundle  modelled on a vector bundle  yields a unique linear bundle morphism

See also 
Fiber bundle
Fibered manifold
Vector bundle
Affine space

Notes

References 
 S. Kobayashi, K. Nomizu, Foundations of Differential Geometry, Vols. 1 & 2, Wiley-Interscience, 1996, .
 
 Sardanashvily, G., Advanced Differential Geometry for Theoreticians. Fiber bundles, jet manifolds and Lagrangian theory, Lambert Academic Publishing, 2013, ; .
 

Differential geometry
Fiber bundles